Russell Earl Kelly is an American Christian theologian, apologist, author, speaker and blogger. He writes non-fictional theological books. Russell is best known for evangelizing and debating why tithing 10% to one's church is not a Christian obligation. His conclusion places him in company with Christian leaders including John F. MacArthur, J. Vernon McGee and C. I. Scofield.

Kelly has been the subject of media coverage including participating in a live 90 minute tithing debate in London on Revelation TV. On November 23, 2007, the Wall Street Journal published an article by Suzanne Sataline, "The Backlash Against Tithing", to which Kelly was a major contributor. On March 2, 2008, Russell was featured on the CBS Sunday Morning news cover story, "To Tithe or Not to Tithe". He was subsequently mentioned in Charisma magazine online.

Biography
Raised in a Baptist home as one of six children, Russell grew up in Jacksonville, Florida, before the family moved to Marietta, Georgia, while he was in the tenth grade in 1960. From June 1962 until June 1966, he was in the US Air Force, learned Chinese Mandarin at Yale University and was  promoted to the Transcription Department while serving in Taiwan. In 1964, Russell married. He presently resides in Washington, Georgia, and teaches at the Victory Baptist Church Bible Institute.

Education
Th. M.: Covington Theological Seminary, Fort Oglethorpe, Georgia; cum laude
Ph. D.: Covington Theological Seminary, Fort Oglethorpe, Georgia; 2000; cum laude

Russell graduated cum laude from Sprayberry High in 1962. From June 1962 to June 1966 he was in the US Air Force, received 22 semester hours in Chinese Mandarin at Yale University and was soon promoted to the Transcription Department while serving in Taiwan. Russell graduated cum laude from Southern Missionary College in Tennessee in 1976, now called Southern University Of Seventh Day Adventist, and served two churches in Georgia, four in North Dakota and one in South Carolina.

Although legally blind since 1989, Russell subsequently completed a Th. M.. and a Ph. D. at the independent Baptist-oriented Covington Theological  Seminary in Fort Oglethorpe, Georgia, in August 2000. His dissertation was on the subject of tithing. From that dissertation came his first book, Should the Church Teach Tithing? A Theologian’s Conclusions about a Taboo Doctrine. His second book is Exposing Seventh-day Adventism, published in 2005. His third book, From Gethsemane to Ascension, An Ultimate Harmony of the Gospel, Easter and Resurrection Plays (February 2008) is in conversational style.

Criticism and countercriticism
Critics say that because his education is from unaccredited schools his Ph.D. is fraudulent. Others challenge his sincerity and his motives. In response, Russell provides a webpage regarding his education and abilities, including having graduated "cum laude" from the Yale University Institute of Far Eastern Languages while in the Air Force, earning 22 semester hours and received a B.A. from Southern University Of Seventh Day Adventist, which is fully accredited. He notes that there are hundreds of religious schools that do not want the government telling them how or what to teach. Having been legally blind since 1989 and not able to drive, his choices of education were severely limited.

Personal life
Theologically, Russell is a conservative evangelical dispensational Baptist. He spends much of his time writing and is available for travel. His favorite hobby is singing gospel, Elvis (tribute artist), Marty Robbins and Frank Sinatra.

Reception 
After Should the Church Teach Tithing was published in January 2001, multiple sources addressed the book. A July 2003 Christianity Today letter to the editor stated, "Next to the Bible this book will change your life. It is that theologically sound and powerful. There are many good theological books on this subject, but this book (theological, academic, not for the faint of heart) should be read by anyone wanting the 'facts' as related to scripture, time and history and the church." In 2003, New Jerusalem Ministries listed the book for suggested reading. In 2004, Dr. David Alan Black at SEBTS published an essay in tithing in agreement with Kelly. 
 
November 6, 2006:  Andreas J. Köstenberger and David A. Croteau, "Will a Man Rob God? (Malachi 3:8): A Study of Tithing in the Old and New Testaments", in Bulletin of Biblical Research 26.1 (2006).
 
November 23, 2007: The Wall Street Journal published an article by Suzanne Sataline, "The Backlash Against Tithing".
 
November 27, 2007: In response to the Wall Street Journal article, the BPNEWS, Baptist Press, published an article, "The Bible and Giving", by Dr. Daniel Akin, President Southeastern Baptist Theological Seminary on The Bible and Giving. Except for his opening statement, the article is exactly what Kelly teaches in his book and on his web site.
 
2007: WAVA-FM in Washington, D. C. mentions Russell Kelly, his book and web site.
 
March 2, 2008: As a result of the Wall Street Journal articles Kelly was interviewed in his home and featured on the CBS Sunday Morning News cover story, "To Tithe or Not to Tithe". The video has remained very popular online. Transcripts are available. 
 
March 7, 2008: BPNEWS, Baptist Press, published a long rebuttal of Kelly's 2 minute CBS News comments by Dr. Kenneth Hemphill in which both his name and book were mentioned. Kelly has since repeatedly attempted to persuade Dr. Hemphill to dialog with him, accessible from Kelly's blog.
 
March 11, 2008: Charisma magazine mentioned Russell Kelly and the CBS article on the first page of its online edition.  
 
July 18, 2008: In a rare occasion the Texas Baptist Standard (SBC) printed Kelly's comments in response to a tithing article.

September 14, 2008: The St. Petersburg Times mentioned Kelly and his book, Should the Church Teach Tithing, in a news article.
 
On March 30, 2011, he participated in a live 90 minute tithing debate in London on Revelation TV. The trip was paid for by a friend.

March 2018: Russell has appeared on Susan Puzio's Blogtalk Radio and Rapture Ready numerous times discussing tithing and Seventh-day Adventism.

Notes

American theologians
Living people
1944 births